Embrace is a 2001 novel by South African author Mark Behr.

Embrace is the story of the sexual awakening of Karl De Man, a 13-year-old pupil at the Berg, an exclusive boys' school in South Africa in the 1970s. Karl's time at school is interwoven with descriptions of his time at home with his loving, but traditional, family.

Karl is punished after joining in casual sexual games in the dormitory, Karl falls in love. He simultaneously has an affair with his best friend, Dominic, whose liberal parents know he is gay, and his choirmaster, Jacques Cilliers.

2001 novels
21st-century South African novels
Novels set in South Africa
Novels by Mark Behr
Novels with gay themes
Fiction set in the 1970s
Novels set in boarding schools
2000s LGBT novels
Abacus books
2001 LGBT-related literary works